Gisèle Mendy (born December 19, 1979) is a Senegalese judoka, who played for the middleweight category. She won three medals for her division at the African Judo Championships (2005, 2006, and 2008). She also captured a silver medal in the same division at the 2007 All-Africa Games in Algiers, Algeria, losing out to Algeria's Rachida Ouerdane.

Mendy represented Senegal at the 2008 Summer Olympics in Beijing, where she competed for the women's 70 kg class. She lost the first preliminary round match, by an ippon (full point) and a te gatame (hand armlock), to German judoka and Olympic bronze medalist Annett Böhm. Because her opponent advanced further into the semi-finals, Mendy offered another shot for the bronze medal by entering the repechage rounds. Unfortunately, she was defeated in her first match by Ukraine's Nataliya Smal, who successfully scored a waza-ari-awasete-ippon (full point) and a kuchiki taoshi (single leg takedown), at fifty-two seconds.

References

External links

NBC 2008 Olympics profile

Senegalese female judoka
Living people
Olympic judoka of Senegal
Judoka at the 2008 Summer Olympics
1979 births
African Games silver medalists for Senegal
African Games medalists in judo
Competitors at the 2007 All-Africa Games
20th-century Senegalese women
21st-century Senegalese women